Asthena plenaria is a moth in the family Geometridae. It is found in China.

References

Moths described in 1897
Asthena
Moths of Asia